Arthur Billitt was a former lead presenter of the long running BBC television programme Gardeners' World.

He took over from the first presenter Percy Thrower who in 1976 invoked the wrath of the BBC by falling foul of their 'no advertising' policy and was fired for endorsing fertilisers on TV. Billitt was the co-presenter and took over the lead role at his own home, Clack's Farm, in Worcestershire, fronting the programme until 1979 when Geoff Hamilton took over. Billitt is regarded as having a very practical style of gardening with large beds and straight rows of vegetables. His work quickly changed the  garden into an allotment and national showpiece.

References

English gardeners
English television presenters
Living people
Year of birth missing (living people)
British television presenters